Yashoda Gurung is a Nepalese politician currently serving as a member of the House of Representatives. She was elected to the House of Representatives from the CPN (Maoist Centre) party list under the indigenous people quota. She was also a member of the 1st Nepalese Constituent Assembly and was elected from the party list.

Personal life 
She is married to CPN (Maoist Centre) politician Dev Prasad Gurung with whom she has two children.

References 

Living people
Nepal MPs 2017–2022
Members of the 1st Nepalese Constituent Assembly
Communist Party of Nepal (Maoist Centre) politicians
1968 births